The Japanese 33rd Mixed Brigade was a military unit of the Imperial Japanese Army.

History
This Mixed Brigade was a detachment of the IJA 10th Division commanded by Major Gen. Nakamura in the Battle of Rehe in the battle along the Great Wall in 1933.

See also
List of Japanese Mixed Brigades

References 

Japanese World War II brigades